Béla Ivády de Ivád (14 November 1873 – 19 March 1962) was a Hungarian politician, who served as Minister of Agriculture between 1931 and 1932. He also served as acting leader of the Party of National Unity (NEP) in 1933.

His son was Sándor Ivády, water polo player and Olympic gold medalist.

References
 Magyar Életrajzi Lexikon	

1873 births
1962 deaths
People from Timiș County
People from the Kingdom of Hungary
Agriculture ministers of Hungary